Omolon is a meteorite fallen in 1981 in the Omolon River basin, Magadan (Russia). It is a pallasite.

History
On May 16, 1981 at 5:10 there was a report from a meteorological station of a bright fireball.
The meteorite was recovered in June 1990.

Specimens
Main mass: North-East Complex Research Institute, Russian Academy of Sciences Far-East Division, Ul. Portovaya 16, Magadan 685000, Russia.

See also 
 Glossary of meteoritics
 Meteorite

Notes

External links 
 Meteoritical Bulletin Database

Meteorites found in Russia